Polytheistic peoples from many cultures have postulated a thunder god, the personification or source of the forces of thunder and lightning; a lightning god does not have a typical depiction, and will vary based on the culture. In Indo-European cultures, the thunder god is frequently known as the chief or King of the Gods, e.g. Indra in Hinduism, Zeus in Greek mythology, and Perun in ancient Slavic religion.

Thunder gods

Mediterranean 

 God in Abrahamic religions
 Teshub (Hurrian mythology)
 Adad, Bel, Ishkur, Marduk (Babylonian-Assyrian mythology)
 Baʿal, Hadad (Canaanite and Phoenician mythology)
 Set (Egyptian mythology)
 Tarḫunna (Hittite mythology)
 Tarḫunz (Luwian mythology)
Vahagn (Armenian Mythology)
Zibelthiurdos (Thracian mythology)
 Zeus (Greek Mythology)
 Jupiter (Roman Mythology)

Northwestern Eurasia 

 Armazi (god) Georgian Mythology 
 Afi (Abkhaz Mythology)
 Ambisagrus, Loucetios (Gaulish mythology) 
 Atämshkai (Moksha mythology)
 Gebeleizis (Dacian mythology) 
 Horagalles (Sami mythology)  
 Jupiter, Summanus (Roman mythology)
 Orko (Basque mythology)
 Perëndi (Albanian mythology) 
 Perkūnas (Baltic mythology)
 Perkwunos (Proto-Indo-European mythology)
 Perun (Slavic mythology) 
 Pikne or Pikker (Estonian mythology)
 Ukko or Perkele (Finnish mythology)
 Uacilla (Ossetian mythology)
 Taranis (Pan-Celtic) 
 Tharapita or Taara (Estonian mythology) 
 Thor (Germanic mythology)
 Fulgora (Roman mythology)
 Astrape and Bronte (Greek mythology)

East Asia 

 Dianmu
 Leigong
 Raijin
 Susanoo

South Asia 

 Indra (Hindu mythology and Buddhist mythology)
 Parjanya (Hindu mythology)
 Raja Indainda (Batak mythology)
 Vajrapani (Buddhist mythology)
 Dino Siwek (Hebraica mythology)
 Thunder Poorna - God of destruction | Ultimate source of poorna power

Vietnam 
 Thiên Lôi (chữ Hán: 天雷)  
 Bà Sét (chữ Nôm: 婆𩂶)
 Pháp Lôi (chữ Hán: 法雷)
 Pháp Điện (chữ Hán: 法電)

Philippines 

Kidul (Kalinga mythology)
Ovug (Ifugao mythology)
Aninitud angachar (Ifugao mythology)
Child of Kabunian (Ibaloi mythology)
Kidu (Bugkalot mythology)
Revenador (Ilocano mythology)
Bathala (Tagalog mythology)
Kidlat (Tagalog mythology)
Gugurang (Bicolano mythology)
Linti (Bicolano mythology)
Dalodog (Bicolano mythology)
Kaptan (Bisaya mythology)
Linting Habughabug (Capiznon mythology)
Ribung Linti (Suludnon mythology)
Upu Kuyaw (Pala'wan mythology)
God of Animals (Surigaonon mythology)
Diwata Magbabaya/Bathala (Subanon mythology)
Anit/Anitan (Manobo mythology)
Spirit of Lightning and Thunder (Teduray mythology)

Americas 

 Thunderbird (Iroquois and Huron mythology)
 Aktzin (Totonac mythology)
 Haokah (Lakota mythology)
 Xolotl and Tlaloc (Aztec mythology)
 Cocijo (Zapotec mythology)
 Chaac (Maya mythology)
 Yopaat (Maya mythology)
 Chibchacum (Muisca mythology)
 Apocatequil (Incan mythology)
 Illapa (Incan mythology)
 Tunupa (Aymara mythology)
 Tupã (Guaraní mythology)
 Kasogonagá (Toba mythology)
 Mur (Atibaia's mythology)

Africa 

 Shango (god of thunder and lightning, Yoruba Nigeria)
 Oya (goddess of hurricanes, storms, death and rebirth, consort of Shango in Yoruba religion)
 Set (Egyptian mythology)
 Nzazi (god of thunder and lightning; master of thunder dogs in Kongo mythology)
 Azaka-Tonnerre (West African Vodun/Haitian Vodou)
 Mulungu
 Xevioso (alternately: Xewioso, Heviosso. Thunder god of the So region)
 Amadioha (Igbo, Nigeria)
 Obuma. Also Abasi Obuma (god of thunder, Ibibio-Efik Mythology, Nigeria)
 Àlamei (So region)
 Kiwanuka (god of thunder and lightning, Buganda, Uganda)
 Umvelinqangi (god of thunder, earthquakes, sun and sky in Zulu mythology)
 Ta Kora (God of War and Strife in the Akom religion, as well as God of Thunder and lightning in the Northern Akan peoples' sect of Akom, such as the Asante)
 Bobowissi (God of Thunder in the Southern Akan peoples' sect of Akom, such as the Fante. Also rival to Tano)

Oceania 

 Haikili (Polynesian mythology)
 Tāwhaki (Polynesian mythology)
 Kaha'i (Polynesian mythology)
 Te Uira (Polynesian mythology)
 Nan Sapwe (Pohnpeian mythology)

Australia 
 Mamaragan (Australian Aboriginal (Kunwinjku) mythology)

New Zealand 

 Whaitiri (Māori mythology)
 Tāwhirimātea (Māori mythology)

In literature
The Hindu God Indra was the chief deity and at his prime during the Vedic period, where he was considered to be the supreme God. Indra was initially recorded in the Rigveda, the first of the religious scriptures that comprise the Vedas. Indra continued to play a prominent role throughout the evolution of Hinduism and played a pivotal role in the two Sanskrit epics that comprise the Itihasas, appearing in both the Ramayana and Mahabharata. Although the importance of Indra has since been subsided in favor of other Gods in contemporary Hinduism, he is still venerated and worshipped.

In Greek mythology, the Elysian Fields, or the Elysian Plains, was the final resting places of the souls of the heroic and the virtuous, evolved from a designation of a place or person struck by lightning, enelysion, enelysios. This could be a reference to Zeus, the god of lightning, so "lightning-struck" could be saying that the person was blessed (struck) by Zeus (/lightning/fortune). Egyptologist Jan Assmann has also suggested that Greek Elysion may have instead been derived from the Egyptian term ialu (older iaru), meaning "reeds," with specific reference to the "Reed fields" (Egyptian: sekhet iaru / ialu), a paradisiacal land of plenty where the dead hoped to spend eternity.

 H. Munro Chadwick, The Oak and the Thunder-God, Journal of the Anthropological Institute of Great Britain and Ireland (1900).

Music
 Gene Simmons of KISS's title song is "God of Thunder", regarding his "Demon" onstage persona.
 Rick Allen of Def Leppard was first referred to as the "Thunder God" by Joe Elliott, the lead singer, during the first concert of the Hysteria World Tour.
In June 2019, Eagles Of Death Metal released a cover of KISS's “God Of Thunder”.

Video games

 Raiden (Mortal Kombat)
 Cidolfus Orlandeau (Final Fantasy Tactics)
 Orlanth (King of Dragon Pass, Six Ages: Ride Like the Wind, and the fictional Glorantha setting in which these games are set)
 Enel (One Piece)
 Raikou (Pokémon)
 Thundurus (Pokémon)
 Karana (EverQuest)
 Phosphora (Kid Icarus: Uprising), although she is not a goddess, but a heavenly warrior in the service of Viridi
 Ishtar (Fire Emblem), given the title of Goddess of Thunder due to wielding the holy thunder tome Mjölnir
 Raiden Shogun (Genshin Impact), also known as Ei, one of the current seven archons
Volibear (League of Legends), Freljordian God of War and Storms

See also
 Leishen God of Thunder
 Leigong Lord of Thunder
 Catatumbo lightning
 Donar's Oak
 Lightning in religion
 Nature worship
 Sky deity
 Thunderbolt
 Eneru One Piece

References

Comparative mythology
Thunder